Giuseppe Del Puente (January 30, 1841 – May 25, 1900) was an Italian baritone, who played in important role in operatic life in the United States in the 19th century, as he was its first baritone star singer, the first performer of many standard-repertory baritone roles in the United States, and part of the cast of the inaugural performance of the Metropolitan Opera in 1883.

Early years and education 

Giuseppe Camillo Carlo Del Puente was born in Naples, Italy, to Francesco Del Puente and Vincenza Vastarelli. From a noble family of Spanish origin, Giuseppe eventually inherited the title Marquis de Murcia. Del Puente began his studies at the Conservatory of San Pietro a Majella as a young boy, originally devoting himself to cello under Gaetano Ciandelli. Upon discovering a fine baritone voice, he studied singing under Alfonso Guercia and Domenico Scafati, himself a student of Alessandro Busti and the castrato Girolamo Crescentini. When at age 17 he joined Garibaldi's army, his voice was still that of a soprano. After a year in the army, he returned to the Conservatory. By this point his voice had changed to what he thought was that of a tenor. But it dropped still lower, until it seemed to even out at a baritone. It was with that voice that he finished his musical studies over the course of two years.

Operatic career 

Del Puente made his baritone debut at Iași, Romania alongside tenor Italo Campanini, with whom he would share many triumphs. Quickly he was engaged with and sang at the leading theaters in Europe, such as Apollo, Rome; La Scala, Milan; San Carlo, Naples; and others in Russia, Spain, Germany, and France. In London, he made an impression on Maurice Strakosch, brother-in-law of Adelina Patti. who engaged him for his own company in 1873 and later took him to the United States. Del Puente made his debut there in 1874 at the New York Academy of Music as Telramund in Lohengrin and remained in Strakosch's company until 1875.

From 1875 to 1882 he toured with Col. Mapleson's company and the Nilsson Concert Troupe. Just as Mapleson's fortunes began to decline, Henry Abbey offering higher fees to some Mapleson's artists, including Del Puente, was able to lure them away to his company for the inaugural season of the Metropolitan Opera. The first performance was Gounod's Faust on October 22, 1883. Del Puente sang the role of Valentin in a cast that included Christina Nilsson, Italo Campanini, Sofia Scalchi, and Franco Novara.

Del Puente was a part of numerous operatic premieres. He sang his most famous role, Escamillo, in the London and American premieres of Carmen in 1878. At the Met, Del Puente created the roles of Barnaba and Alfio in the American premieres of La Gioconda and Cavalleria rusticana, respectively and being the leading baritone of the company, participated in several Met premieres of standard repertoire: Mignon, La traviata, Barbiere di Siviglia, Les Huguenots, and Carmen. At Philadelphia, he created roles in the American premieres of Les pécheurs des perles, L'amico Fritz, and Manon Lescaut. He sang Mercutio in the American premiere of Roméo et Juliette (with Patti) for the inauguration of the Chicago Auditorium Theater on December 10, 1889. He sang in the London premiere of La forza del destino, as well as its American premiere at the New York Academy of Music with Campanini. He sang Iago in the first American success of Verdi's Otello, alongside Francesco Tamagno in his American debut.

Del Puente's final Met performance was February 2, 1895 in the role of Don Giovanni. Afterward he became a singing teacher, opening a studio under the name "Verdi School" in Philadelphia. He also compiled a written work, Progressive Exercises in Vocalization, divided into two parts—Exercises in Sustained Singing and Exercises in Flexibility and Execution. This work was advertised publisher Theodore Presser in Etude magazine, but no copy has yet been found.

In addition to the more than 60 roles in his repertoire, Del Puente did a great deal of work as a concert singer.

Voice and style 
A thorough description of Del Puente's voice and versatility comes from J.H. Duval:

I have said that the greatest artists only absolutely surpasses in a few roles, yet Del Puente sang all the roles a baritone could sing. He surpassed in some, was Splendid in all. His grand ringing tones of such astounding beauty, richness and sonority could be modulated down to be just right for Alfonso in La favorita or any other Bel Canto role. I have never heard him equalled  Rossini's Barbiere, Meyerbeer's Nelusko in L'africana, the Count in Le nozze di Figaro, Amonasro in Aida, nor even approached in Il trovatore, or Carmen (Italian version). As Don Giovanni he was second only to Maurel. As Rigoletto it was a matter of taste between those two baritones. Maurel's had more surprising effects, and Del Puente's passion and voice swept everything before him. As a gentleman he was unique and always proclaimed Maurel was a greater artist than he, "except in Rigoletto". 

His voice was often described as "orotund" and a "full, round baritone of very musical quality". Duval, a voice teacher himself, describes it with more detail:

A baritone voice being between a center and the bass is apt to lean toward one or the other in quality. Del Puente had all the depth and range of both a high baritone and a bass-baritone and a wonderful ring all over its compass—a round rich ring with nothing of a thin or tenorish quality in any part of it.The largest opera houses gave him not the slightest trouble to fill, with an ocean of sound of richest colors.I have never heard such a voice—so thrilling so intoxicatingly beautiful.

Personal life 

Del Puente's first wife was mezzo-soprano Luisa Borghi (1834 – October 1, 1886), with whom he had a daughter, Amelia Speranza Angelina Vincenza Del Puente, born July 16, 1866 in Botoșani, Romania. His second wife was contralto Helen Dudley Campbell. Their son, Joseph Del Puente (born August 27, 1892), later sang as a baritone in musical theater.

Giuseppe Del Puente died of apoplexy on May 25, 1900 at his home at 4303 Walnut Street, Philadelphia. He was buried at West Laurel Hill Cemetery in a grave that was unmarked until 1964, when local Philadelphia opera enthusiasts discovered it and erected a fitting monument.

References 

19th-century Italian male opera singers
Italian operatic baritones
1841 births
1900 deaths
Musicians from Naples
Voice teachers